"Lab Pe Aati Hai Dua" (also known as "Bachche Ki Dua"), is a duʿā or  prayer, in Urdu verse authored by Muhammad Iqbal in 1902. The dua is recited in morning school assembly almost universally in Pakistan, and in Urdu-medium schools in India.

The song has long been sung in the private The Doon School in Dehradun, India, in a secular morning assembly ritual. The Imam of the Jama Masjid, Delhi, Muhibullah Nadwi, recited it as a boy in an English-medium primary school in India in the 1940s.  Even earlier, the prayer was broadcast by All India Radio, Lucknow, a few months after Iqbal's death in 1938. The prayer has also been interpreted by an all-women's American bluegrass music band, Della Mae, which toured Islamabad and Lahore in Pakistan in 2012.

In October 2019, a headmaster of a government-run primary school in Pilibhit, Uttar Pradesh, India, was suspended by the district education authorities following complaints by two Hindu nationalist organizations (Vishwa Hindu Parishad and Bajrang Dal) that the song, which was being recited in the school's morning assembly, was a "madrasa prayer." Ali was later reinstated but transferred to another school.

Lyrics

References

Poetry by Muhammad Iqbal
Pakistani poems
Indian poems
1902 poems
Institutional songs